Evander Holyfield vs. Michael Moorer was a professional boxing match contested on April 22, 1994, for the WBA and IBF heavyweight championships.

Background
After defeating Riddick Bowe in a closely contested rematch to regain his WBA, IBF and Lineal Heavyweight titles, Holyfield had hoped for a unification match with the WBC Heavyweight Champion Lennox Lewis. Instead, the WBA and IBF demanded Holyfield face the mandatory challenger, undefeated southpaw Michael Moorer.

The fight
In a shocking upset, Moorer would defeat Holyfield via majority decision with judges Jerry Roth and Chuck Giampa giving Moorer the victory by the scores of 115–114 and 116–112 respectively, while Dalby Shirley scored the fight even at 114–114. In the second round, Moorer was in control of the fight until Holyfield caught him with a left hook that dropped Moorer to the canvas. Though earning a knockdown would usually result in a round win for the fighter, judge Jerry Roth scored the round even at 10–10 instead of 10–9 which would have made the fight a majority draw in which Holyfield would have kept his titles. Holyfield's manager Shelly Finkel would protest the round, but the decision was upheld.

Aftermath
Evander Holyfield was hospitalized after the fight for dehydration and a rotator-cuff injury. While at the hospital, a kidney bruise was found and he was given large amounts of liquid to help treat the injury. However, Holyfield was soon found to have a heart problem after his lungs filled due to his heart not being able to pump the fluids out. As a result, Holyfield announced his retirement only five days after the fight on April 27, 1994. Holyfield's retirement, however, would be brief as he would return the following year to defeat Ray Mercer.

After Moorer's victory there was talk of a potential Michael Moorer–Lennox Lewis fight. However, Moorer would instead chose to put his newly won titles on the line against 45-year-old ex-Heavyweight champion George Foreman. Though Moorer was ahead on the judges scorecards, Foreman was able to land a short right hand to Moorer's chin, earning the victory by way of knockout and ending Moorer's first reign as champion.

On November 11, 1997, Holyfield and Moorer would meet in a rematch. By this time, Holyfield had regained the WBA Heavyweight title by twice defeating Mike Tyson while Moorer had regained the vacant IBF Heavyweight title after defeating Axel Schulz. This time it would be Holyfield who would earn the victory, sending Moorer to the canvas five times before Mitch Halpern stopped the fight after round 8 and awarded Holyfield the victory via referee technical decision.

References

1994 in boxing
Boxing in Las Vegas
1994 in sports in Nevada
Moorer
World Boxing Association heavyweight championship matches
International Boxing Federation heavyweight championship matches
April 1994 sports events in the United States
Caesars Palace